John Cascaes Caneira (born October 7, 1952) is a retired professional baseball player who played two seasons for the California Angels of Major League Baseball.

Born in Waterbury, Connecticut, Caneira went to Naugatuck High School in Naugatuck, Connecticut. He went 7–0 in his senior season, and was selected by the Pittsburgh Pirates in the 11th round of the 1970 MLB Draft. He opted instead to attend Division III Eastern Connecticut State University in Willimantic, Connecticut. In college, he had an overall 105–20 record, and was a three-time NAIA All-American. 

In 1972 and 1973, he played collegiate summer baseball in the Cape Cod Baseball League (CCBL) for the Bourne Canalmen (1972) and Chatham A's (1973). He was named an all-star both seasons, and won the league's Outstanding Pitcher award in both seasons. 

Caneira was selected by the California Angels in the 1st round of the secondary phase of the 1974 MLB Draft. He made his major league debut for the Angels in 1977, and appeared in 6 games for California that year.

Caneira was inducted into the Eastern Connecticut Athletic Hall of Fame in 1986, and was inducted into the Cape Cod Baseball League Hall of Fame in 2004.

References

External links

1952 births
Living people
Major League Baseball pitchers
California Angels players
Chatham Anglers players
Bourne Braves players
Baseball players from Connecticut
Eastern Connecticut State Warriors baseball players
Sportspeople from Waterbury, Connecticut
Pan American Games medalists in baseball
Pan American Games silver medalists for the United States
Baseball players at the 1971 Pan American Games
American people of Portuguese descent
Medalists at the 1971 Pan American Games
El Paso Diablos players
Idaho Falls Angels players
Quad Cities Angels players
Salinas Packers players
Salt Lake City Gulls players